Raca or RACA may refer to:

People 
 Darko Raca (born 1977), Bosnian-Herzegovinian footballer
 Dragan Raca (born 1961), Cypriot–Serbian basketball player and coach
 Saša Raca, (born 1975), Bosnian Serb footballer

Places 
 Râca, Romania
 Rača, Bratislava, Slovakia
 Raça, a village and suco in East Timor in Lospalos district

Other uses 
 Royal Academy of Culinary Arts, college in Jordan
 Royal Automobile Club of Australia, Australian organisation
 Raca, a Biblical term of Aramaic origin used in Matthew 5:22

See also 
 Rača (disambiguation)